Eulamprotes gemerensis is a moth of the family Gelechiidae. It was described by Peter Huemer and Ole Karsholt in 2013. It is found in Slovakia.

References

Moths described in 2013
Eulamprotes